Kaili Huangping Airport  is an airport serving the city of Kaili, the seat of Qiandongnan Miao and Dong Autonomous Prefecture in Guizhou Province, China.  It is located in Huangping County, 12 kilometers northeast of the county seat and 54 kilometers from Kaili.  Construction started on 28 December 2010 with a total investment of 870 million yuan. The airport was opened on 2 October 2013.

Facilities
The airport has a runway that is 2,600 meters long and 45 meters wide, and a 3,500-square-meter terminal building.  It is projected to handle 200,000 passengers annually by 2020.

Airlines and destinations

See also
List of airports in China
List of the busiest airports in China

References

Airports in Guizhou
Airports established in 2013
2013 establishments in China